<noinclude>

The Chief Justice of Gujarat presides over the Gujarat High Court. They are not appointed by the President of India under warrant. The President is required to consult the Governor of Gujarat and the Chief Justice of India before making such appointment. The Governor of Gujarat administers the oath of office at time of appointment.
 the Acting Chief Justice of the High Court of Gujarat is Justice Ashish Jitendra Desai.

List of Chief justice of Gujarat

References

Chief Justices of the Gujarat High Court
Government of Gujarat
Gujarat High Court
Chief Justices of the Gujarat High Court